

Chart history

References

United States Regional Mexican Songs
2008 in Mexican music
Regional Mexican 2008